Raúl Guadalupe Sánchez Rodríguez (December 12, 1930 – June 30, 2002) was a middle relief pitcher in Major League Baseball who played for two different teams between the  and  seasons. Listed at 6' 0", 150 lb., Sánchez batted and threw right-handed. He was born in Marianao, Cuba.
 
The skinny, hard thrower Sánchez was 21 years old when he entered the majors in 1952 with the Washington Senators, playing for them one year before joining the Cincinnati Redlegs/Reds (1957/1960). His most productive season came in 1957, when he posted career-highs in games (38), wins (3), saves (5), strikeouts (37) and innings pitched (62.1). He also pitched for the 1954 Havana Sugar Kings of the International League.

His nickname in Spanish was "Salivita", which translates roughly as "a little saliva", a reference to Sanchez's reputation for throwing a spitball.

In a three-season career, Sánchez posted a 5–3 record with a 4.62 ERA and five saves in 49 appearances, including two starts and one shutout, giving up 46 earned runs on 86 hits and 43 walks while striking out 48 in  innings of work.

Sánchez died in Pembroke Pines, Florida, at the age of 71.

See also
List of Major League Baseball players from Cuba

References

External links

Retrosheet

1930 births
2002 deaths
Amarillo Gold Sox players
Big Springs Broncs players
Broncos de Reynosa players
Chattanooga Lookouts players
Cincinnati Redlegs players
Cincinnati Reds players
Cuban expatriate baseball players in Canada
Havana Cubans players
Havana Sugar Kings players
Jersey City Jerseys players
Major League Baseball pitchers
Major League Baseball players from Cuba
Cuban expatriate baseball players in the United States
Pericos de Puebla players
Richmond Virginians (minor league) players
Toronto Maple Leafs (International League) players
Washington Senators (1901–1960) players
Cuban expatriate baseball players in Mexico
Baseball players from Havana